Janusz Sybis (born 10 October 1952) is a Polish football striker.

References

1952 births
Living people
Polish footballers
Śląsk Wrocław players
Sportspeople from Częstochowa
Association football forwards
Poland international footballers